Isaac Taylor House, also known as the Taylor-Ward House, is a historic home located at New Bern, Craven County, North Carolina.  It was built about 1796, and is a three-story, three bay, side hall plan Federal style brick dwelling.

It was listed on the National Register of Historic Places in 1972.

References

External links

Historic American Buildings Survey in North Carolina
Houses on the National Register of Historic Places in North Carolina
Federal architecture in North Carolina
Houses completed in 1796
Houses in New Bern, North Carolina
National Register of Historic Places in Craven County, North Carolina
1796 establishments in North Carolina